Isti may refer to:
Isti (Greece), a town of ancient Greece
Isti, Iran, a village in the Ardabil Province of Iran
Isti (Hinduism), one of the five types of yajna in Vedic times
Istituto di Scienza e Tecnologie dell'Informazione, a research institute of the Consiglio Nazionale delle Ricerche in Italy